Born to Be Different is a British documentary series on Channel 4, which follows the lives of six disabled children who were born in the millennium. Series 10 will begin in the UK on 26 March 2020.

Children

 William Davislives with tuberous sclerosis, which causes him to have autism and epilepsy
 Hamish McLeanhas dwarfism
 Zoe Frewhas arthrogryposis
 Shelbie Williamshas trisomy 9, which has caused her to be severely disabled and who died in 2019 
 Emily Speirshas spina bifida
 Nathan Christiehas Down syndrome

Overview

Series 1 (2003)

Series 2 (2004)

Series 3 (2005)

Series 4 (2007)

Series 5 (2009)

Series 6 (2010)

Series 7 (2011)

Series 8 (2012)

Series 9 (2016)

Critical reception
Reviewing the show, TimesOnline commented with irony that "by the end of [it], we had sobered up entirely. A queasy feeling followed, of being pulled morally up and down and in and out until you didn't know whom you pitied or why. The sign, in other words, of excellent television."

In its review, The London Paper expressed concerns about the voyeuristic approach of the show and asks: "what is to be gained from watching harried mothers breaking down, and children being constantly reminded of their problems by the camera crew? [...] Let’s just hope Channel 4's intentions were in the right place."

The music for the series was composed by Julian Stewart Lindsay.

See also
 Up Series
 Child of Our Time

Notes

References

External links
Born to Be Different on channel4.com

2009 British television series debuts
2000s British documentary television series
2010s British documentary television series
2020s British documentary television series
British television documentaries
Channel 4 documentary series
Documentary films about children with disability